Falcatula falcatus is a moth of the family Sphingidae. It is known from savanna and woodland from Zimbabwe to Malawi, Mozambique, Zambia, the Central African Republic and eastern Africa.

The length of the forewings is 38–42 mm for females, which are larger than the males. The forewing upperside ground colour is generally pale grey and the hindwing upperside ground colour is brownish-buff, contrasting with the pale grey of the forewing. Females are somewhat darker.

The larvae feed on Sclerocarya caffra, Erythrina abyssinica and Erythrina excelsa.

References

Moths described in 1903
Smerinthini
Moths of Africa